Geoffroy Mussard (born 11 March 1966), known by his stage name Shurik'n, is a French rapper from Marseille. He is one of the members of the hip hop group IAM, as well as a major solo artist. With his brother Faf Larage (Raphaël Mussard), he also is a member of the group La Garde.

Mussard was born in Miramas on 11 March 1966, with Malagasy and Réunionnais origins. In 1988, he met Akhenaton, with whom he formed IAM. Mussard adopted the stage name Shurik'n Chang-Ti, reflecting his interest in Oriental culture and his background in martial arts, such as judo, karate and kung fu. IAM released its first album, De la Planète Mars, in 1990.

After three albums with IAM, Shurik'n decided to start pursuing a solo career with his 1998 album Où je vis. The album debuted atop the French album chart. In 1997 he had already collaborated with his brother on the compilation disc Chroniques de Mars, and the group released its album La Garde in 2000. Shurik'n also continued working with IAM, which released its fifth album, Revoir un printemps, in 2003.

Discography

Albums 
Solo

Mixtapes / Others
2000: La Garde (with Faf Larage) (joint album)
2010: Daz Tape (mixtape)

with IAM
1989: IAM Concept
1991: ... de la planète Mars
1993: Ombre est lumière
1997: L'école du micro d'argent
2003: Revoir un printemps
2007: IAM Official Mixtape
2007: Saison 5

Singles

Notes 

1966 births
French people of Malagasy descent
Musicians from Marseille
Living people
Rappers from Bouches-du-Rhône
French people of Réunionnais descent